Abdul Kanneh (born September 3, 1990) is an English professional Canadian football defensive back for the Ottawa Redblacks of the Canadian Football League (CFL). He played college football at New Mexico Highlands University.

Professional career

Cleveland Browns
Kanneh was signed by the Cleveland Browns in 2013 as an undrafted free agent. He was later cut by the Browns during the 2013 training camp.

Ottawa Redblacks
In 2014, Kanneh signed a contract with the Ottawa Redblacks of the CFL and played three years for the team, winning his first Grey Cup championship in 2016.

Hamilton Tiger-Cats
The Hamilton Tiger-Cats signed Kanneh to their roster in 2017, but his injury-plagued campaign led to him only dressing in seven games that year.

Toronto Argonauts
On the day of 2018 training camp cuts, on June 10, 2018, Kanneh was traded to the Toronto Argonauts for an eighth-round pick in the 2019 CFL Draft. He played in 24 games for the Argonauts over two years, recording 95 defensive tackles, one sack, and one interception. He became a free agent in 2020.

Ottawa Redblacks (II)
Upon entering free agency, Kanneh signed with his original CFL team, the Redblacks, on February 11, 2020 to a one-year contract. He re-signed with Ottawa on January 25, 2021. Kanneh played in eight games for the Redblacks in 2021, contributing with 28 defensive tackles, three interceptions and one touchdown. Kanneh and Ottawa agreed to a contract extension on February 1, 2022.

References

External links
Ottawa Redblacks bio 
NFL transactions
Signs with Orlando Predators

1990 births
Living people
American football defensive backs
English players of American football
English players of Canadian football
New Mexico Highlands Cowboys football players
Ottawa Redblacks players
Hamilton Tiger-Cats players
Toronto Argonauts players
Sportspeople from London
Black British sportspeople